The British Nationality Act 1772 (13 Geo. 3 c. 21) was an Act of the Parliament of Great Britain was a British nationality law which made general provision allowing natural-born allegiance (citizenship) to be assumed if the father alone was British.

This Act was one of the British Subjects Acts 1708 to 1772.

The Act was repealed by the British Nationality and Status of Aliens Act 1914.

References

External links
Text of the Act

Great Britain Acts of Parliament 1772
British nationality law
Repealed Great Britain Acts of Parliament